Snyder is a city in Kiowa County, Oklahoma, United States. The population was 1,394 at the 2010 census. This figure represented a decline of 7.6 percent from 1,509 persons in 2000.

History
The founder was Charles G. Jones of Oklahoma City, president of the Oklahoma City and Western Railroad, who had a dispute with that municipality. Jones named the new town for Bryan Snyder, an employee of the St. Louis and San Francisco Railway (Frisco), which ran north and south through the townsite.

In 1905, a tornado hit Snyder and killed 113 people, including the superintendent of public schools. Fires in 1906 and 1909 destroyed most of the wooden buildings along Main Street. These were quickly replaced by brick buildings. By the time of statehood in 1907, Snyder had a population of 607 residents. The number grew to 1,122 in 1910.

Geography
Snyder is located at  (34.657246, -98.952535). The city is at the junction of U.S. routes 62 and 183.

Demographics

As of the census of 2000, there were 1,509 people, 607 households, and 398 families residing in the city. The population density was 1,190.6 people per square mile (458.8/km). There were 761 housing units at an average density of 600.4 per square mile (231.4/km). The racial makeup of the city was 84.49% White, 7.02% African American, 2.45% Native American, 0.07% Pacific Islander, 4.64% from other races, and 1.33% from two or more races. Hispanic or Latino of any race were 10.21% of the population.

There were 607 households, out of which 31.5% had children under the age of 18 living with them, 46.8% were married couples living together, 12.7% had a female householder with no husband present, and 34.4% were non-families. 31.8% of all households were made up of individuals, and 16.5% had someone living alone who was 65 years of age or older. The average household size was 2.41 and the average family size was 3.01.

In the city, the population was spread out, with 27.2% under the age of 18, 8.7% from 18 to 24, 24.3% from 25 to 44, 21.0% from 45 to 64, and 18.8% who were 65 years of age or older. The median age was 38 years. For every 100 females, there were 87.0 males. For every 100 females age 18 and over, there were 83.5 males.

The median income for a household in the city was $23,295, and the median income for a family was $32,167. Males had a median income of $26,324 versus $17,386 for females. The per capita income for the city was $13,188. About 21.5% of families and 25.3% of the population were below the poverty line, including 30.6% of those under age 18 and 17.0% of those age 65 or over.

Economy
The economy of Snyder and the surrounding area is largely dependent on farming and ranching. Important crops are cotton, corn, wheat, and hay.

Parks and recreation
Great Plains State Park, on Tom Steed Reservoir, is 6.9 miles north of town.

Wichita Mountains Wildlife Refuge is 14.5 miles northeast.

The scenic cobblestone community of Medicine Park on Lake Lawtonka is 16.1 miles east-northeast.

Lake Frederick is 18 miles south-southeast.

Notable people
 James V. McClintic, (1878-1948), was a politician, attorney and farmer who moved from Texas to Snyder in 1902. He served in a number of elective local and state offices, finally serving for ten terms in the U.S. House of Representatives (1878-1948). Returned to Oklahoma to private law practice. Died near Chicago abord a train and was buried in Oklahoma City.
 Jack L. Treadwell (1919-1977), was a highly decorated career officer in the U.S. Army who was living in Snyder when he enlisted in 1941. He served in WWII and Vietnam retired with the rank of colonel in 1974. He received the Congressional Medal of Honor in 1945 for his actions in Germany in April 1945.

Notes

See also
 1905 Snyder, Oklahoma tornado

References

External links
 Taylor, Ethel Crisp. "Snyder," Encyclopedia of Oklahoma History and Culture, Oklahoma Historical Society, 2009. Accessed March 25, 2015.
 Oklahoma Digital Maps: Digital Collections of Oklahoma and Indian Territory

Cities in Oklahoma
Cities in Kiowa County, Oklahoma
Populated places established in 1902